Lee Marks is an American football coach. He is the running backs coach for the Washington Huskies. He previously was the interim head football coach at Fresno State. He previously played running back for Boise State and in the Arena Football League.

Playing career
Marks played college football as a running back at Boise State University. He accumulated 1,773 rushing yards and eight touchdowns over his final two seasons as a starter where he was name an All-Western Athletic Conference (WAC) selection both years. Following his graduation he spent a year in the Arena Football League with the Boise Burn.

Coaching career

Early coaching career
Marks began his career in coaching at Colorado  where he worked as an assistant speed and strength and conditioning coach from 2007 until 2009. He spent the next two seasons as a graduate assistant at the University of Sioux Falls. In 2012 he  worked as the running backs coach at South Dakota State. In 2013 he went to Arkansas State where he worked as  the assistant director of strength and conditioning under head coach Bryan Harsin.

Boise State
In 2014 Marks followed Harsin to his alma mater serving as an assistant strength coach. In 2015 he was made the team’s running backs coach a position he held until 2019. In 2019 he was given the additional title of director of special teams.

Fresno State
In 2020 Marks went to Fresno State where he was made the team’s running backs coach, assistant head coach, and run game coordinator. After it was announced that Kalen DeBoer would leave for Washington, Marks was named the team’s interim head coach to coach the New Mexico Bowl.

Washington
After Marks won the New Mexico Bowl, it was announced he would be following Kalen DeBoer to Washington and become the team’s running backs coach.

Head coaching record

Notes

References

External links
 Washington profile

Year of birth missing (living people)
Living people
American football running backs
Boise Burn players
Arkansas State Red Wolves football coaches
Boise State Broncos football coaches
Boise State Broncos football players
Colorado Buffaloes football coaches
Fresno State Bulldogs football coaches
Sioux Falls Cougars football coaches
South Dakota State Jackrabbits football coaches
Washington Huskies football coaches
People from Reseda, Los Angeles
Coaches of American football from California
Players of American football from Los Angeles
Sports coaches from Los Angeles
African-American coaches of American football
African-American players of American football
21st-century African-American sportspeople